Soccer Club Gjilani, commonly known as Gjilani, is a professional football club based in Gjilan, Kosovo. The club play in the Football Superleague of Kosovo, which is the top tier of football in the country.

History
SC Gjilani is the club which was formed in 1995 by Afrim Kqiku, in very unfavourable times. Despite difficulties with the organization they had managed to maintain the club competing, and, after 5 years since its foundation, they won the Kosovar Cup and got promotion to the top-level Kosovar league, the Football Superleague of Kosovo, where they have been playing ever since.

Supporters

Skifterat are the clubs ultras group which formed in 1999 after Kosovo war. They are also known as the Red and White boys and they live for this club and this supporter group. They are also one of the best supporter groups in Kosovo. They were named after a KLA brigade called the Falcons.

Incidents
At Skifterat there are groups of hooligans who do incidents especially during the derby against Drita. Also there has been other incidents involving mass blows among hooligans where they ended up with some injured. There was an incident between the fans of Gjilan and Drenica and also the most dangerous incident was between Gjilan and Vëllaznimi in 2017–18 season, where 23 people injured. There have also been incidents of burning of flags of countries like Serbia, North Macedonia, Greece, or Montenegro.

Club rivalries

Drita

There is often a fierce rivalry between the two strongest teams in a national league and this is particularly the case in Football Superleague of Kosovo, where the game between Gjilani and Drita is known as the Kosovo Derby.

One hour before the match, the two camps are organized in groups and always avoid eventual incidents between the two ultras groups. They divide the streets from where they will go to the stadium, which is good in a way to avoid the breakdown of this holiday and the much anticipated confrontation in Gjilan.

Crest and colours
The first design and colours in 1995 was red and white in the center with a circle and one ball that formed the badge of the club. In 2000, the colors were changed by the new president of the club in purple and light blue, but early in the 2008–09 season at the initiative of the leadership of Gjilan's supporters club  (Falcons), back before the club colors.

Stadium
The club has played its home games at the Gjilan City Stadium is a multi-purpose stadium in Gjilan, Kosovo. The stadium has a capacity of 10,000 people all seater.

Honours

European record
Gjilani competed in the UEFA Europa League for the first time in the 2020–21 season, entering at the preliminary round. On 9 August 2020, the draw was held and Gjilani were drawn against Sammarinese side Tre Penne. On 21 August 2020, Gjilani beat the Sammarinese side Tre Penne at San Marino Stadium in Serravalle.

Players

Current squad

Other players under contract

Personnel

Managerial history

 Muharrem Sahiti (2002–2004)
 Muharrem Sahiti (2007–2009)
 Musa Selimi (12 Jul 2014 – 19 Apr 2015)
 Sadat Pajaziti (12 Jul 2015 – 5 Nov 2015)
 Bylbyl Sokoli (6 Nov 2015 – 5 Apr 2016)
 Arbnor Morina (17 Apr 2016 – 11 Apr 2018)
 Alban Hyseni (12 Apr 2018 – Jun 2018)
 Sadat Pajaziti (Jul 2018 – 20 Feb 2019)
 Alban Hyseni (Feb 2019 – Mar 2019)
 Gentian Mezani (20 Mar 2019 – present)

References

External links
SC Gjilani at Soccerway

 
Sport in Gjilan
Association football clubs established in 1945
Football clubs in Yugoslavia
Football clubs in Kosovo